Francesca Biagini (born 31 July 1973) is a German and Italian mathematician specializing in mathematical finance, stochastic calculus, and probability theory. Topics in her research include fractional Brownian motion and portfolio optimization for inside traders. She is a professor of applied mathematics and vice president for international affairs and diversity at Ludwig Maximilian University of Munich, and president of the Bachelier Finance Society.

Education and career
Biagini was a high school student in Pistoia, and earned a laurea in mathematics in 1996 from the University of Pisa, under the mentorship of Margherita Galbiati. She completed a doctorate in 2001 at the Scuola Normale Superiore di Pisa, with the dissertation Quadratic hedging approach for interest rate models with stochastic volatility supervised by Maurizio Pratelli.

She worked as an assistant professor at the University of Bologna from 1999 to 2005, when she moved to Ludwig Maximilian University of Munich as an associate professor. After declining an offer to become a chaired professor at the University of Hanover in 2008, she was given a chair as full professor of applied mathematics at the University of Munich in 2009.

She became vice president for international affairs and diversity at the University of Munich, and is president of the Bachelier Finance Society for the 2020–2021 term.

Books
With Massimo Campanino, Biagini is the coauthor of Elementi di Probabilità e Statistica (Springer, 2005), an Italian-language textbook on probability theory and statistics translated into English as Elements of Probability and Statistics: Introduction to Probability with the De Finetti's Approach and to Bayesian Statistics (Springer, 2016). With Yaozhong Hu, Bernt Øksendal, and Tusheng Zhang, she is the coauthor of the monograph Stochastic Calculus for Fractional Brownian Motion and Applications (Springer, 2008).

Recognition
Biagini was awarded the Princess Therese of Bavaria Prize, an award for outstanding women scientists at Ludwig Maximilian University of Munich, in 2019.

References

External links
Home page

1973 births
Living people
20th-century Italian mathematicians
Italian women mathematicians
Probability theorists
University of Pisa alumni
Scuola Normale Superiore di Pisa alumni
Academic staff of the University of Bologna
Academic staff of the Ludwig Maximilian University of Munich